The Clambake Club of Newport is a historic private club at 353 Tuckerman Avenue in Middletown, Rhode Island.

Building
The club's main building was listed on the National Register of Historic Places in 1995.  It is located at the tip of Easton's Point, dividing Easton Bay and Sachuest Bay on the southern coast of Middletown, with fine views of Newport's mansions.  The club, organized in 1895, first leased land at this site, then purchased it in 1903, building its first purpose-built clubhouse c. 1903–07.  This building was significantly damaged by the New England Hurricane of 1938.  The clubhouse was rebuilt in 1939; club records indicate a design for a substantially new building was prepared by William L. Van Alen.

See also
National Register of Historic Places listings in Newport County, Rhode Island

References

Buildings and structures completed in 1907
Clubhouses on the National Register of Historic Places in Rhode Island
Buildings and structures in Middletown, Rhode Island
Clubs and societies in the United States
National Register of Historic Places in Newport County, Rhode Island